Devadas Devaprabhakara (1932–1978) was an Indian organic chemist and a professor at the department of chemistry of the Indian Institute of Science. He was known for his studies on cyclic allenes and medium-ring dines. His researches on the reduction, hydroporation and isomerization of them and his synthesis of a number of cyclic hydrocarbons have assisted in rationalizing the understanding of the substrates. He published his researches by way of several peer-reviewed articles; the inline repository of the Indian Academy of Sciences have listed 48 of them. He was also an elected fellow of the Indian Academy of Sciences. The Council of Scientific and Industrial Research, the apex agency of the Government of India for scientific research, awarded him the Shanti Swarup Bhatnagar Prize for Science and Technology, one of the highest Indian science awards, in 1976, for his contributions to chemical sciences. He died on 12 January 1978, at the age of 45.

See also 
 Cyclic hydrocarbons

References

External links 
 

Recipients of the Shanti Swarup Bhatnagar Award in Chemical Science
1932 births
1978 deaths
Indian scientific authors
Fellows of the Indian Academy of Sciences
Indian organic chemists
Academic staff of the Indian Institute of Science